Klaus Lisiewicz (born 2 February 1943) is a German former football player who competed in the 1964 Summer Olympics.

References

1943 births
Living people
German footballers
Olympic footballers of the United Team of Germany
Olympic bronze medalists for the United Team of Germany
Olympic medalists in football
Footballers at the 1964 Summer Olympics
Medalists at the 1964 Summer Olympics
DDR-Oberliga players
German footballers needing infoboxes
Association football forwards